The 2021 Women's Basketball Invitational (WBI) was a single-elimination tournament consisting of eight National Collegiate Athletic Association (NCAA) Division I teams that were not selected to participate in the 2021 NCAA Division I women's basketball tournament or 2021 Women's National Invitation Tournament. The 2021 field was announced on March 15. The tournament was held March 19–21 at the William Exum Center on the campus of Kentucky State University in Frankfort, Kentucky. The format was an 8-team tournament with a winners and consolation bracket, guaranteeing all participating teams three games. Cleveland State beat Portland in the final.

Bracket

See also
2021 NCAA Division I women's basketball tournament
2021 Women's National Invitation Tournament

References

External links
 Women's Basketball Invitational

Women's Basketball Invitational
Women's Basketball Invitational
Women's Basketball Invitational
Women's Basketball Invitational
Frankfort, Kentucky